Alnetoidea is a genus of true bugs belonging to the family Cicadellidae.

Species:
 Alnetoidea alneti

References

Cicadellidae
Hemiptera genera